Jorge Mario Lescieur Talavera (born 10 March 1954) is a Mexican politician affiliated with the Institutional Revolutionary Party. As of 2014 he served as Deputy of the LX Legislature of the Mexican Congress representing Chiapas.

References

1954 births
Living people
People from Chiapas
Institutional Revolutionary Party politicians
21st-century Mexican politicians
Deputies of the LX Legislature of Mexico
Members of the Chamber of Deputies (Mexico) for Chiapas